Garret Barry, also called Gerat (died 1646), was an Irish soldier and military writer, who fought for Spain in the Eighty Years' War and then for the Irish insurgents in the Rebellion and the Confederate Wars. When young he left Kinsale at its surrender in 1602 for Spain where he took service, first as marine in the Atlantic Fleet and then in the Army of Flanders. While in Spanish service, he fought at the Siege of Breda in 1624/1625. He retired with the rank of captain in 1632. Returning to Ireland he was at the Rebellion appointed general of the insurgents' Munster Army. He took Limerick in June 1642 but was defeated at Liscarroll by Inchiquin in September. He was confirmed as General of the Munster Army by the Irish Catholic Confederation but was in practice superseded by Castlehaven in 1643.

Birth and origins 
Garret was probably born near the end of the 16th century. and is probably the 'Garrot Barry', eldest of the four sons of 'David FitzGarret Barry', 'dwelling at Rincorran', who is mentioned in Pacata Hibernia in the context of the Siege of Kinsale, Munster, Ireland in 1602. Rincurran, also spelled Rincorran, is a locality near Kinsale. Rincurran Castle stood where Charles Fort, built in 1677, now stands. It was also called Barry Óg's Castle as it belonged to the Barry Óg (younger) branch of the de Barrys. Garret's father was a member of a cadet branch of the De Barrys, possibly the Barry Ogs. The de Barrys were a landed Old English family, seated in County Cork. During most of Barry's life, first David de Barry, 5th Viscount Buttevant and then David Barry, 1st Earl of Barrymore were heads of the family. Unlike Barry, both sided with the government.

Siege of Kinsale 
Tyrone's Rebellion, also called the Nine Years' War in Ireland was a theatre of the Anglo-Spanish War (1585–1604), as a Spanish expeditionary force under Juan del Águila landed at Kinsale end September 1601 Old Style (O.S.). Águila garrisoned Rincurran Castle. Charles Blount, 8th Baron Mountjoy, Deputy of Ireland, rushed down to Munster and started the siege early in October. He took Rincurran Castle in November. After Tyrone's defeat at the battle of Kinsale in December and the surrender of Kinsale in February 1602, Barry, in company of his parents and three brothers, was allowed to leave Ireland together with the Spanish in March 1602.

Spanish Service 
Barry served for four years as a marine in the Spanish Atlantic Fleet in the Irish company of Hugh Mostyn. In June 1605 his unit was transferred to the Army of Flanders to bolster the offensive led by Ambrogio Spinola, against the United Provinces of the Netherlands. Barry landed at Dunkirk (part of the Spanish Netherlands at the time) in December 1605. His unit joined the newly created Irish Tercio, commanded by Henry O'Neill, a younger son of Hugh O'Neill, Earl of Tyrone. Barry fought as a soldier at the siege of Rheinberg in 1608. Some time between 1610 and 1621 Henry died and was succeeded as maestre de campo by Shane O'Neill, who was however too young and Owen Roe O'Neill was acting commander. Tyrone died in far away Rome and in the eyes of the Spanish Shane O'Neill, the eldest surviving son, succeeded as Conde de Tyrone. His tercio became Tyrone's Tercio.

Barry was promoted ensign in 1623. The tercio's maestre de campo, Henry O'Neill, died about 1626 and Owen Roe O'Neill succeeded in his post. Barry fought at the capture of Breda in 1624 and 1625. In 1628 he became captain in command of a company in Tyrone's Tercio. In 1632 he retired from active service.

In about 1639 he returned to Ireland to recruit for the Army of Flanders.

General of the Munster Army 
In October 1641 Phelim O'Neill launched the Irish Rebellion from the northern province of Ulster. When Barry visited Ireland in 1640 to recruit for the Spanish Army, his endeavour was interrupted by the arrival of the rebellion in Southern Ireland. Barry sided with his fellow Catholics.

In January 1642 Barry and Maurice Roche, 8th Viscount Fermoy besieged Richard Boyle, 1st Earl of Cork in Youghal. On 2 March 1642 Donough MacCarty, the 2nd Viscount Muskerry joined the rebellion To resolve the rivalry between Muskerry and Fermoy, Barry was chosen as General of the insurgents' Munster army.

In March 1642 Barry, Muskerry besieged William St Leger, the President of Munster, in Cork but weas driven off by Murrough O'Brien, 6th Baron Inchiquin, on 13 April.

Barry then besieged King John's Castle in Limerick for the insurgents and took it through skillful use of the siege techniques he had learnt in Flanders—in particular undermining of the castle's walls (see Siege of Limerick 1642). The castle surrendered in June 1642. He then used the artilry captured at King John's Castle to capture other castles in County Limerick. He then tried to invade County Cork again but was driven off in disorder at the Battle of Liscarroll on 3 September 1642 by Inchiquin with a numerically much inferior force.

When the insurgents organised themselves as the Irish Catholic Confederates in October 1642, Barry was confirmed as commander of the Munster army by the general assembly.

In 1643 Barry prepared to besiege the town of Cappoquin in County Waterford, held by Inchiquin. When Ormond came south from Dublin and besieged New Ross in March 1643, Barry tried to relieve it with the Munster army, but Thomas Preston with the Leinster army got there first. Preston relieved the town but was beaten by Ormond at the Battle of New Ross on 18 March 1643. The war in southern Ireland was stopped by the Cessation signed on 15 September 1643.

Barry seems to have kept the position until his death in early March 1646 at Limerick but took little further part in the war.

{|
!colspan=3|Timeline
|-
!align="left"|Age!!align="left"|Date!!align="left"|Event
|-
|0||1580, estimate||Born, probably at Rincurran, County Cork
|-
|||1601, 23 Sep||The Spanish landed at Kinsale
|-
|||1602, Mar||Left Ireland with his parents and his three brothers
|-
|||1603, 24 Mar||Accession of King James I, succeeding Queen Elizabeth I
|-
|||1625, 27 Mar||Accession of King Charles I, succeeding King James I
|-
|||1632, 12 Jan||Thomas Wentworth, later Earl of Stafford, appointed Lord Deputy of Ireland
|-
|||1632||Retired from active service for Spain
|-
|||1641, 23 Oct||Outbreak of the Irish Rebellion|-
|||1642, 23 Jun||Captured Limerick Castle
|-
|||1643, 15 Sep||Cessation (truce) between the Confederates and the government|-
|||1643, Nov||James Butler, 1st Marquess of Ormond appointed Lord Lieutenant of Ireland|-
|||1645, 21 Oct||Giovanni Battista Rinuccini, the papal nuncio, landed in Ireland.|-
|||1646, Mar||Died in Limerick
|}

 Works 
Barry wrote two published books:

 The Siege of Breda (Louvain: Henricus Hastenius, 1627) online at Google Books
 A Discourse of Military Discipline (Brussels: Widow of John Mommart, 1634) online at the University of Michigan

The Siege of Breda is essentially a translation into English of the Obsidio Bredana by Herman Hugo with some additions from Barry's own participation in this siege. Hugo's book had appeared in Latin in 1626.

The Discourse'' was meant as an introduction to the subject for young Irishmen envisaging to take Spanish service as infantry officers. It was dedicated to David Barry, 1st Earl of Barrymore: "To the Right Honorable David Barry, Earle of Barry-Moor, Viconte of Butevante, Baron of Ibaune, Lord of Barrycourte and Castelliones", who was the head of the Barrys, even if a Protestant.

Notes and references

Notes

Citations

Sources 

 
 
 
  – 1579 to 1603
 
 
 
  – N to R (for Ormond)
  – 1641 to 1645 (Preview)
 
 
 
 
  – (for timeline)
 
  – 1534–1691
 
 
 
  – G to Z
  – Parliaments & Biographies (PDF downloadable from given URL)
 
  – Preview
 
 
  – 1601 to 1602
  – Preview
 
  – 1641 to 1643

1647 deaths
Garret
Irish Roman Catholic Confederates
Irish soldiers in the Irish Confederate Wars
Irish soldiers in the Spanish Army
Military personnel from County Cork
Year of birth missing
17th-century Spanish military personnel
Military writers